Kazimieras Černis (born November 11, 1958, Vilnius) is a Lithuanian astronomer and astrophysicist, active member of the IAU, and a prolific discoverer of minor planets and comets. In 2012, he discovered 420356 Praamzius, a trans-Neptunian object and dwarf planet candidate.

Černis graduated from Vilnius University in 1981. From 1981 to 1990, he worked at the Lithuanian Academy of Sciences' Institute of Physics. Since 1996, Černis is a senior scientist at Vilnius University Institute of Theoretical Physics and Astronomy.

His research interests are photometry of stars, structure of the Milky Way, Solar System, comets, and asteroids. He is the leader of an asteroid search project at Molėtai Astronomical Observatory. Until 2006, Černis discovered 25 new comets (Černis comets) and 125 asteroids. As of 2016, the Minor Planet Center credits him with the discovery and co-discovery of 113 numbered minor planets he made during 2001–2012. He has published papers on photometry of stars and did research of interstellar extinction towards the direction of galactic anticenter.

List of discovered minor planets

See also

References

External links 
 100 and counting: SOHO's score as the world's top comet finder
 A short history of the 48-cm Grubb Parsons telescope

1958 births
Discoverers of minor planets

Lithuanian astrophysicists
Lithuanian astronomers
Lithuanian schoolteachers
Living people
Scientists from Vilnius
Vilnius University alumni
Academic staff of Vilnius University